Joseph Aristide Landry (July 10, 1817 – March 9, 1881) was a member of the U. S. House of Representatives representing the state of Louisiana.  He served one term as a Whig.

Biography 
Joseph Landry was born near  Donaldsonville, Ascension Parish, Louisiana, on July 10, 1817. He attended school in Cape Girardeau, Missouri.

Political career 
He served member of the Louisiana House of Representatives in 1840, then elected as a Whig to the  Thirty-second  Congress, serving from March 4, 1851, to March 3, 1853.

Later career 
After leaving Congress, he was president of the police jury of  Ascension Parish in 1861.

Civil War 
Before the  Civil War, he was first sergeant in the Chasseurs de l'Ascension. During the war, he attached to Company B of the Cannoneers of Donaldsonville, fighting on the side of the Confederacy.

Death and burial 
He died near Donaldsonville on March 9, 1881, and is interred in Donaldsonville Catholic Cemetery.

See also
Landry Tomb

External links 
Bio at Congress.gov
Political Graveyard

Joseph Aristide Landry in the Louisiana Dictionary of Biography — Scroll down to find the Landrys.

1817 births
1881 deaths
Members of the Louisiana House of Representatives
Whig Party members of the United States House of Representatives from Louisiana
19th-century American politicians
People from Donaldsonville, Louisiana
Burials at Ascension of our Lord Catholic Church Cemetery (Donaldsonville)